When We Lost Our Heads is a 2022 Canadian novel author by Heather O'Neill published by HarperCollins.

Set in the fictional Golden Mile neighbourhood of Montreal in the 1800s, the novel follows two best friends, Marie Antoine and Sadie Arnett, who develop a deep and obsessive friendship early in childhood. 

Many of the characters names are taken from real French historical figures. Marie Antoine is an illusion to French queen Marie Antoinette while Sadie Arnett is an allusion to Marquis de Sade and her work Justine & Juliette is a reference to two of de Sade's most well known works: Justine and Juliette.

Summary
Marie Antoine is raised as the spoiled sole heiress of a sugar empire in Montreal's Golden Mile. She eventually befriends Sadie Arnett, the only daughter of poor social climbers with political ambitions. Marie is jealous of Sadie's genius and talent for writing while Sadie is jealous of the way Marie is constantly coddled and loved. Nevertheless the two girls view each other as each other's only true friend. One day Sadie suggests they play "duel" using Marie's father's pistols. Unbeknown to them the pistols are loaded. They are prevented from killing each other by Agatha, a maid who tried to intervene.  

Marie places the blame for the murder on Sadie and Sadie is sent to an all girl's school in England. Marie travels across America with her father constantly feeling ennui and missing Sadie. Meanwhile, at the all girl's school, Sadie accidentally finds a book of pornography and begins to write erotic texts to entertain herself and the girls at school. 

When she is 21 Marie is courted by Phillip, Sadie's older brother. Having no interest in any particular man she agrees to allow Phillip to court her as long as he returns Sadie to her. Sadie is brought back to Montreal where she and Marie continue to be fascinated with one another. However after a disastrous dinner in which Sadie brings up the murder the Arnett's try to have Sadie instituionalized. A kind maid allows her to escape sending her to the Squalid Mile, a working class part of Montreal.

In Squalid Mile Sadie is taken in by George, a cross dressing midwife who works in a brothel. George introduces Sadie to the world of sex and helps to edit her work. 

Meanwhile, no longer interested in Phillip, Marie tries to call of their engagement and is raped by him. The rape makes her realize that her beloved, recently deceased father, was repeatedly raping the maids. Marie decides to now focus on running her sugar empire as ruthlessly as she can in order to accumulate more power and money.

Sadie eventually finishes her novel Justine and Juliette which, through George's help, becomes a wild success. Flattered by the book, which Marie knows is based on her, Marie retrieves Sadie and promises to always protect her and her writing. While removing Sadie from the squalid mile they encounter Mary Robespierre, Marie's working class doppleganger who loathes Marie. Sadie warns her that Mary is a threat. 

Heartbroken that Sadie has abandoned her George writes and publishes a pamphlet against Marie and her factory. Mary harnesses the revolutionary energy and tries to incite the working class women to riot against Marie though George suspects her motives are not to uplift the masses but simply to take what Marie has. 

While going through her father's papers in an attempt to buy off Mary, Marie discovers that she and Mary are twins, the children of a brief affair between their father and Agatha. Marie was a child adopted to replace the biological child who was born to her father and his wife who died at four months. Marie burns the evidence of her parentage and attempts to murder Mary. 

In return Mary poisons Marie. After Marie dies, Mary is quickly discovered to be the murderess and brought to trial. Sadie confesses that both she and Marie murdered Agatha as children though rather than being hanged she is institutionalized. George is revealed to be the biological child of Marie's parents who goes on to become a journalist who fights for working class women.

Reception
The novel was widely praised with CBC calling it "a page-turning novel".

The novel was nominated for the 2022 Grand Prix du livre de Montréal.

References

2022 novels